Isla de Muerta is the twelfth studio album by the melodic hard rock band Ten, released on 20 May 2015 by Rocktopia Records. The album is named after the mythical "Island of the Dead" from pirate legend. The album's cover was illustrated by Gaetano Di Falco. The band has released two singles (and lyric videos) from the album, for "Tell Me What to Do" and "This Love".

The album cover was illustrated by Gaetano Di Falco, who also illustrated the cover of the band's previous studio album Albion.

Track listing
All songs written by Gary Hughes.

European version (Rocktopia Records 003RTP)
 (i) Buccaneers (Instrumental) / (ii) Dead Men Tell No Tales - 6:27
 Tell Me What to Do - 4:15
 Acquiesce - 4:45
 This Love - 4:42
 The Dragon and Saint George - 5:16
 Intensify - 6:39
 (i) Karnak (Instrumental) / (ii) The Valley of the Kings - 8:10
 Revolution - 5:56
 Angel of Darkness - 3:57
 The Last Pretender - 6:40
 We Can Be As One - 3:28 (European version bonus track)

Asian version (Avalon Records MICP-11210)
 (i) Buccaneers (Instrumental) / (ii) Dead Men Tell No Tales - 6:27
 Revolution - 5:56
 Acquiesce - 4:45
 The Dragon and Saint George - 5:16
 Intensify - 6:39
 This Love - 4:42
 (i) Karnak (Instrumental) / (ii) The Valley of the Kings - 8:10
 Tell Me What to Do - 4:15
 Angel of Darkness - 3:57
 The Last Pretender - 6:40
 Assault And Battery - 4:52 (Japanese version bonus track)

Personnel
Gary Hughes – vocals, guitars, backing vocals
 Dann Rosingana – lead guitars
 Steve Grocott - lead guitars
John Halliwell – rhythm guitars
Darrel Treece-Birch – keyboards, programming
Steve Mckenna – bass guitar
 Max Yates – drums and percussion

Production
Written and produced by Gary Hughes
Mixing and mastering by Dennis Ward

Concepts
 The song "The Dragon and Saint George" is based on the legend of Saint George who slayed the dragon and saved the city of Silene. 
 "Revolution" is a recounting of the story of the French Revolution.
 "Karnak/The Valley of the Kings" is a song about the Curse of the pharaohs during the discovery of the tomb of Tutankhamun in The Valley of the Kings.

Chart positions

References

Ten (band) albums
2015 albums